Kleinwelsbach is a village and a former municipality in the Unstrut-Hainich-Kreis district of Thuringia, Germany. Since December 2019, it is part of the town Nottertal-Heilinger Höhen.

References

Unstrut-Hainich-Kreis
Former municipalities in Thuringia